Julián Ezequiel Serrano (born 16 October 1994) is an Argentine YouTuber, actor, singer and television presenter.

Biography 
Julián Ezequiel Serrano was born on October 16, 1993, in Paraná. He is the oldest son of Óscar Alfredo Serrano Badioli and Diana Gabriela Itria, he has younger sister named Yolanda Serrano.

He defines himself politically as a Libertarian and supports the Argentine economist and politician, Javier Milei

YouTube channel 
His first YouTube channel was created in 2008 and called ArgentinoJes where he used to upload videos with images and music made on Windows Movie Maker, this channel was unsuccessful and banned for using inappropriate vocabulary. In 2009, he created a channel called Yotmbestoyalpdo (which means: "Yo tampoco tengo nada que hacer" in Argentine Spanish) with covers and humor videos. In 2011, Serrano started with the channel JulianSerrano7 that would give recognition not only in his country but also throughout Latin America and Spain. In 2013, he began his acting career in a series called Aliados, created by Cris Morena.

Career

Television career 
Julián Serrano abandoned his studies of psychology in his hometown to move to Buenos Aires to begin his actor career in Aliados. In that series he has played Franco Alfaro, a marginal teenager, without work or study, who earns his living with dubious acts, total the opposite with the other characters in the series.

Singing career 
In 2015, Serrano began his career as a solo singer under the stage name Jota Esse, the initial letters of his name in Spanish language. That same year he began a national tour across the country. His first album is available on iTunes and Spotify. On 13 March 2020, Julián Serrano announced via Twitter and Instagram that he signed a contract with Warner Music Group.

Filmography

Television

Series

TV Program

Movies

Discography 
 2013 — Esta es mi Historia
 2014 — Eres
 2014 — Love is Louder ft. Oriana Sabatini
 2014 — Ella baila enamorada
 2015 — Yo te Protejo
 2015 — Fenómeno de Redes
 2015 — Hasta Mañana
 2015 — Mirame
 2015 — Dime por favor
 2016 — Fatal
 2016 — Vida Tranquila
 2018 — Confesión
 2018 — Dicen Que ft. MYA
 2018 — Y si te Atreves
 2019 — Gracias
 2020 — María
 2020 — Dos Desconocidos ft. PEMA
 2020 — Un Trago Más
 2020 — Quedarme Contigo
 2020 — Seguiré conmigo
 2020 — Hoy

Awards and nominations

References 

Living people
Spanish-language YouTubers
People from Paraná, Entre Ríos
YouTube channels
Argentine YouTubers
Argentine male telenovela actors
Argentine pop singers
Argentine people of Spanish descent
Argentine people of Italian descent
Argentine anti-communists
1993 births
Bailando por un Sueño (Argentine TV series) participants
Bailando por un Sueño (Argentine TV series) winners
Participants in Argentine reality television series